"Send Me on My Way" is a 1994 song by American worldbeat rock band Rusted Root. Originally released as a rough version on 1992's Cruel Sun, it was re-recorded in 1994 for their second album, When I Woke and released as the lead single. Root's frontman, Michael Glabicki, wrote the lyrics, and its other members – Liz Berlin, John Buynak, Jim Dispirito, Jim Donovan, Patrick Norman and Jennifer Wertz – contributed to the track. It peaked at number 72 on the Billboard Hot 100.

While the song was not an immediate commercial success, it has since become an "iconic track of the 1990s", mainly due its prominence in several movies and TV series, including the 1995 film Pie in the Sky, the 1996 film Matilda, the television show Party of Five, the 2002 film Ice Age.

Critical reception
Critical reception has been mixed. In January 2014, in a review for Cruel Sun, Kurt Keefner said that "the African vocal riff from 'Send Me on My Way' is bad Ladysmith Black Mambazo", whereas Chris Baker of Syracuse.com said "The song's pep and lightheartedness is undoubtedly responsible for its success. Unlike the fervor found in songs like 'Ecstasy' or 'Lost in a Crowd,' 'Send Me on My Way' is unbridled optimism – perfect for a children's movie."

Music video
Directed by Sean Alquist, the music video was filmed in South Dakota in late 1994.

Charts

Certifications

In popular culture
NASA engineers chose "Send Me on My Way" as "wake up" music for the Mars Exploration Rover Opportunity, for Sol 21.

Because of its use in popular culture, frontman Glabicki has said that the song has "become a different thing for us. It's this thing that lives next to us. Everyone has a great memory or connection with the song. The song grew up and now has a life of its own; it's bigger; we get to sit back and watch it."

References

1992 songs
1995 singles
Mercury Records singles
PolyGram singles
Rusted Root songs